Earnest Jackson (born April 11, 1950) is a former professional American football cornerback for eight seasons in the National Football League (NFL) for the New Orleans Saints, Atlanta Falcons, and the Detroit Lions.  He played college football at Duke University.

References

1950 births
Living people
American football cornerbacks
Atlanta Falcons players
Detroit Lions players
Duke Blue Devils football players
New Orleans Saints players
All-American college football players
People from Hopkins, South Carolina
Players of American football from South Carolina